The WTA Atlanta is a defunct WTA Tour affiliated tennis tournament played from 1975 to 1983.  It was held in Atlanta in the United States and played on indoor carpet courts from 1975 to 1981 and outdoor hard courts from 1982 to 1983.

Finals

Singles

Doubles

See also
 Atlanta WCT – men's tournament (1970–1976)
 Atlanta Open – men's tournament (since 2010)

References
 WTA Tour history

Carpet court tennis tournaments
Defunct tennis tournaments in the United States
Hard court tennis tournaments
Indoor tennis tournaments
Recurring events disestablished in 1983
Recurring sporting events established in 1975
Sports competitions in Atlanta
1975 establishments in Georgia (U.S. state)
Virginia Slims tennis tournaments
WTA Tour
1983 disestablishments in Georgia (U.S. state)
History of women in Georgia (U.S. state)